The Works of art in The Aesthetics of Resistance are those included in Peter Weiss' novel The Aesthetics of Resistance. They form a kind of musée imaginaire (imagined museum) with more than a hundred named artists and just as many artworks, mainly of the visual arts and literature, but also of music and the performing arts.
Peter Weiss wrote the three-volume novel, which runs to around 1000 pages, between 1971 and 1981. The plot is set between 1936 and 1945, and is located in Nazi Berlin, Spain during the civil war, Paris before the World War II and Stockholm as one of the places of refuge for the German exiles. The characters are based on real personalities, the main protagonists organising themselves in the resistance group known as the Red Orchestra. Representations of artists, works of art, their contexts and backgrounds are included in the plot line and form a web of mutual interconnections. The reception takes place in multi-layered reflections by the protagonists of the novel, through the reference to historical and political events, to mythological set pieces, to artists' biographies, to dream images or in critical questioning.

List of artworks
The following list contains about one hundred works of art in the visual arts, literature and music that are extensively discussed, named, enumerated or included in Aesthetics of Resistance. In addition, motifs of mythology as well as events and places directly related to Peter Weiss' reception of art are included in the list. The artworks and backgrounds are largely arranged in the order in which they appear in the book. Exceptions are motifs that receive a more detailed description after a brief mention on later pages. The hundred or so artists featured in the novel can be found in the list of artists in Aesthetics of Resistance.

By clicking on the arrow in the table headings, the list can be sorted differently; a detailed description of the sorting options can be found at the end of the table.

See also
 Artists in The Aesthetics of Resistance

References

Bibliography

 
 
 
 
 

Lists of works of art